Lawrence Scott FRSL (born in Trinidad, 1943) is a novelist and short-story writer from Trinidad and Tobago, who divides his time between London and Port of Spain. He has also worked as a teacher of English and Drama at schools in London and in Trinidad. Scott's novels have been awarded (1998) and short-listed (1992, 2004) for the Commonwealth Writers' Prize and thrice nominated for the International Dublin Literary Award (for Aelred's Sin in 2000, Night Calypso in 2006 and Light Falling on Bamboo in 2014). His stories have been much anthologised and he won the Tom-Gallon Short-Story Award in 1986.

Life and career

Born in Trinidad on a sugarcane estate where his father was the manager for Tate & Lyle, Lawrence Scott is a descendant of Trinidad's French and German creoles. "His father's side came from Germany in the 1830s and were called Schoener. His mother's family, the Lange dynasty, were French-descended and part of an established white Creole community."

Scott was educated at Boys' RC School, San Fernando, Trinidad (1950–54), and by the Benedictine monks at the Abbey School, Mount Saint Benedict, Tunapuna (1955–62), before leaving at the age of 19 for England. There he attended Prinknash Abbey, Gloucester, studying philosophy and theology (1963–67), St Clare's Hall Oxford, gaining a BA Hons. degree in English Language & Literature (1968–72), and Manchester University, earning a Certificate in Education, English & Drama (Distinction) in 1972–73.

Between 1973 and 2006 Scott worked as a teacher (of English and Drama) at various schools in London and in Trinidad, including Sedgehill, London; Thomas Calton Comprehensive, London; Presentation College, San Fernando, Trinidad; Aranguez Junior Secondary, Trinidad; Tulse Hill Comprehensive and Archbishop Tenison's, London. Between 1983 and 2006 he taught Literature and Creative Writing at City & Islington Sixth Form College, London.

In parallel to his teaching, Scott's career as a creative writer includes the publication since the 1990s of novels and collections of short stories. His stories have also been broadcast on BBC radio and have been anthologised internationally, notably in The Penguin Book of Caribbean Short Stories, The Oxford Book of Caribbean Short Stories and Our Caribbean, A Gathering of Lesbian & Gay Writing from the Antilles (Duke University Press). He has published poetry in several anthologies and journals, including Colours of a New Day: Writing for South Africa (Lawrence & Wishart, 1990), Caribbean New Voices 1 (Longman, 1995), Trinidad and Tobago Review, Cross/Cultures 60 (Editions Rodopi B.V. Amsterdam – New York, 2002), Agenda and Wasafiri. In addition he is the author of numerous essays, reviews and interviews on the work of other Caribbean writers, including Earl Lovelace and Derek Walcott.

Scott was a Writer-in-Residence at the University of the West Indies (UWI) in 2004. In 2006–09 he was a senior research fellow of The Academy for Arts, Letters, Culture and Public Affairs at the University of Trinidad and Tobago (UTT).

His academic research has included the Golconda Research/Writing Project, an oral history project in Trinidad. He has also researched extensively the life and times of Trinidad's 19th-century artist Michel-Jean Cazabon, which work informs his 2012 novel Light Falling on Bamboo.

In 2019 Scott was elected as a Fellow of the Royal Society of Literature.

Writing 

In 1986, Scott's short story "The House of Funerals" won the Tom-Gallon Award. Since 1992 his published books include four novels, a collection of short stories and a work of non-fiction.

His first novel, Witchbroom (1992), was shortlisted for a Commonwealth Writers' Prize and was broadcast as a Book at Bedtime on BBC Radio 4 in 1993, abridged by Margaret Busby in eight episodes, produced by Marina Salandy-Brown and read by the author. A 25th-anniversary edition of Witchbroom, published by Papillote Press, was launched in Trinidad at PaperBased bookshop in Port-of-Spain on 18 March 2017, with a keynote address by Earl Lovelace and readings by Ken Ramchand, Barbara Jenkins and Marina Salandy-Brown. It was described by Trinidad and Tobago Newsday as "a breathtaking novel, filled with memorable characters and important history." According to the review in BookBlast, "Lawrence Scott weaves a magical, lush tapestry of words and images, bringing alive local legends and family narratives; and redressing written histories. The impact of the events recounted still resonate in Caribbean society today. A quasi-historical novel, Witchbroom recounts the story of a colonial white enclave on an offshore island through muddled memories. ... The stories are bewitching and highly disturbing. The reader surfs a tidal wave of addictive fascination like a Dickensian tricoteuse sitting beside the guillotine in Paris watching heads roll during the public executions of 1793-4.

Of his 1994 story collection Ballad for the New World, Publishers Weekly said: "Scott ... has filled his collection of 12 short stories with all the rich nuances of the Caribbean, creating a convincing backdrop that allows even the most sedentary armchair traveler to visualize each tale's progression."

Scott's second novel, Aelred's Sin (1998), described by Raoul Pantin as "a fine and sensitive and compassionate book…a worthwhile contribution to the hallowed tradition of West Indian literature", won a Commonwealth Writers' Prize Best Book (Canada & Caribbean) in 1999. Night Calypso (2004), Scott's next novel, was described by Mike Phillips in The Guardian as "unique in being a serious, knowledgeable and beautifully written treatise about a little-known corner of experience and its relationship to a wider world", while Chris Searle in the Morning Star called it "an educative, startling and moving reading experience".

Scott's most recent novel, Light Falling on Bamboo (2012) was called "really a fascinating read" by Verdel Bishop in the Trinidad Express. Set in early 19th-century Trinidad, while the novel is a re-imagining of the life of the celebrated landscape painter Cazabon, according to Monique Roffey's review in The Independent Scott captures so much more. This novel shows us the dark 'truth of an age' in a small corner of the New World, once dependent on slave labour." For the Financial Times reviewer, Scott has "conjured a convincing fictional portrait ... in this beautifully subtle and sensitive novel." Selwyn Cudjoe's review stated: "Lawrence Scott has written an important historical romance. [...] the loving attention that Scott devotes to detail, sensitivity to light and colour, and his determination to capture the many tones of his landscape and people give his romance a translucence and luminosity that is wondrous to behold. We owe him a debt of gratitude for offering us this way of seeing during this period in our history."

In 2015 Scott's collection of stories Leaving By Plane Swimming Back Underwater was published by Papillote Press. Alexander Lucie-Smith wrote in the Catholic Herald: "Scott’s writing resembles that fretwork familiar from decaying porches and window frames: intricate, almost rococo, and because Trinidad is such a multi-layered place, because nothing is simple, his style is perfectly suited to his subject. Scott comes nearest to any English language author I know to carrying off that difficult task of evoking a place that is real and at the same time completely other."

Scott's newest work, Dangerous Freedom (Papillote Press, 2021), is a historical novel that draws on the life story of Dido Belle.

Selected awards and honours
 1986: Tom-Gallon Short-Story Award
 1999: Commonwealth Writers' Prize Best Book (Canada & Caribbean), for Aelred's Sin
 2019: Elected as a Fellow of the Royal Society of Literature

Bibliography

Novels

Witchbroom (Allison & Busby, 1992, ; Heinemann Caribbean Writers Series, 1993) – shortlisted for a Commonwealth Writers' Prize Best First Book (1993); read on BBC Radio 4's Book at Bedtime (1993; adapted by Margaret Busby, produced by Marina Salandy-Brown). 25th-anniversary edition, Papillote Press, 2017.
Aelred's Sin (Allison & Busby, 1998) – winner of the Commonwealth Writers' Prize Best Book in Canada & Caribbean (1999).
Night Calypso (Allison & Busby, 2004) – shortlisted for a Commonwealth Writers' Prize Best Book in Canada & the Caribbean (2005).
Light Falling on Bamboo (Tindal Street Press, 2012).
Dangerous Freedom (Papillote Press, 2021).

Short stories
Ballad for the New World (Heinemann Caribbean Writers Series, 1994) – includes the story "The House of Funerals" (Tom-Gallon Trust Award, 1986).
Leaving by Plane Swimming Back Underwater (Papilotte Press, 2015)

Non-fiction
Golconda: Our Voices Our Lives (UTT Press, 2009), editor.

Further reading 
 Aiyejina, Funso, 2003. "Self Portrait – Lawrence Scott novelist, short story writer and poet in conversation with Funso Aiyejina" (interview conducted 16 August 1998, Maraval, Port-of Spain), Trinidad and Tobago Review 20, no. 12, December 1998, pp. 10–11, 14–16, 19.
 Ferguson, James. 2000. "The Worlds of Lawrence Scott – beatprofile", Caribbean Beat, No. 43 May/June 2000, pp. 48–52.
 Maes-Jelinek, Hena, "Lawrence Scott's Caribbeanness: A personal reading of Witchbroom and Aelred's Sin", The Literary Criterion 35, 2000.

See also 

 Caribbean literature
 Caribbean poetry
 Postcolonial literature

References

External links 
 Lawrence Scott's website.
 Press release, University of the West Indies.
 Stewart Brown, "The Worlds of Lawrence Scott", The Caribbean Voice profile.
 Andrew Johnson, "NAME IN THE FRAME: Mysterious Caribbean artist who inspired Lawrence Scott's novel", Camden New Journal, 8 November 2012.
 "Lawrence Scott reads at Paper Based book store Normandie Hotel, Trinidad", YouTube video.
 Gemma Bowes, "Writer Lawrence Scott on Trinidad: carnival, calypso and ecotourism", The Guardian, 24 April 2015.
 Njelle W. Hamilton, "On Memory and the Archives of Caribbean History — A Conversation with Lawrence Scott", Wasafiri, 2017.

1943 births
Living people
Trinidad and Tobago novelists
British writers
20th-century novelists
21st-century novelists
Trinidad and Tobago non-fiction writers
Trinidad and Tobago emigrants to the United Kingdom
20th-century short story writers
21st-century short story writers
Trinidad and Tobago male writers
20th-century male writers
21st-century male writers
Male non-fiction writers